Jordan 'Jo' Beckwith is an American YouTuber and advocate also known as Footless Jo. She is a below-knee amputee whose content focuses on disability and mental health awareness.

Early life 
When she was 13, Beckwith fell off a horse while riding in Colorado Springs, fracturing her ankle. She subsequently underwent many surgeries, but remained with chronic pain and limited functionality.

Career 
Beckwith began her YouTube channel, Footless Jo, during her recovery from amputation in 2018. In 2019, the channel became more prominent following a video she released titled, "How I Said Goodbye to My Ankle". That video went viral and garnered over 8 million views. Footless Jo focuses on amputation, disability, and mental health. Beckwith's second channel, Trauma Talk, which she stopped posting to in 2021, explored living in the aftermath of trauma.

In 2021, Beckwith partnered with Shades for Migraine in a media campaign to raise awareness about migraines. She has said her migraines, which began in her 20s, are more debilitating and difficult than being an amputee.

As of April 2022, Footless Jo has 688,000 subscribers. Beckwith also has 40,000 followers on Instagram and 71,800 followers on TikTok.

Personal life 
Beckwith lives in Colorado. In 2018, at age 27, Beckwith began considering amputation after being told that an ankle replacement, the other treatment option, would only delay amputation for another 1.5–5 years. She underwent below-knee amputation on October 11, 2018, at the University of Colorado Hospital in Denver. She was married to Brian until their divorce in 2022.

References 

American amputees
American YouTubers
American disability rights activists
People from Colorado Springs, Colorado
American TikTokers
Living people
1991 births